Phantom Rancher is a 1940 American Western film directed by Harry L. Fraser and starring Ken Maynard.

Plot summary
When Ken Mitchell inherits his late uncle's cattle ranch he finds the community hates him for trying to drive farmers off their land.  He discovers that a respected member of the community named Collins is really behind the activity and may have had his uncle killed.  The only way Ken can gain the community's trust and bring Collins and his gang to justice is appearing as a masked "Phantom Rancher" to dispense justice.

Cast 
Ken Maynard as Ken Mitchell
Dorothy Short as Ann Markham
Harry Harvey as Gopher
Ted Adams as Collins
Dave O'Brien as Henchman Luke
Tom London as Sheriff Parker
John Elliott as Dad Markham
Reed Howes as Lon, Burton Foreman
Steve Clark as Burton
Carl Mathews as Henchman Hank
James Sheridan as Henchman Joe

External links 

1940 films
1940 Western (genre) films
American Western (genre) films
American black-and-white films
1940s English-language films
1940s American films